Dragon eye may refer to:

AeroVironment RQ-14 Dragon Eye, a reconnaissance miniature UAV in use by the U.S. Marine Corps
Dragon Eye (manga), a 2005–08 Japanese manga by Kairi Fujiyama
Longan, an Asian edible fruit sometimes called "dragon eye"

See also
Dragon's Eye (disambiguation)
Dragon Eyes, a 2012 martial arts film directed by John Hyams